The Chilean National Ballet, founded in 1945, is Chile's oldest professional contemporary dance company. It is based at the University of Chile in Santiago, Chile.

History
Germany's Kurt Jooss Ballet company toured South America in 1941, including Santiago, Chile. The Institute of Musical Activities at the University of Chile approached some of the Jooss company's dancers about establishing a dance school at the University of Chile in Santiago. Ernst Uthoff left the Kurt Jooss Ballet to remain in Santiago, establishing a School of Dance at the university. Uthoff was the dance school's director, choreographer, and first master teacher. Along with Uthoff, Lola Botka and Rudolf Pescht left the Jooss company to join the School of Dance as master teachers. A Ballet Corps was eventually added, and under the name the Chilean National Ballet, the company debuted in 1945 with a production of Léo Delibes's Coppelia.

During its history, the company has performed over 200 works. It tours internationally, most extensively to Latin American venues.

See also

Culture of Chile
Ballet

References

Ballet companies in Chile
Contemporary dance companies
Culture in Santiago, Chile